Apega of Sparta (fl. 3rd–2nd century BC) was a Queen of Sparta. Born in Argos, she married Nabis, who later became the tyrant of Sparta. Ancient sources describe her as being as tyrannical as her husband, and even acting as his effective co-tyrant.

The Greek historian, Polybius (203–120 BC, author of The Histories), described Apega as ruling Sparta like a Hellenistic queen, similar to Cleopatra and Arsinoe, because she "received men at court alongside her husband." Polybius also mentioned that she knew the art of dishonouring men by humiliating women belonging to the families of male citizens. Both Nabis and Apega brought suffering and violence to their subjects by stealing their wealth and valuables. Livy writes of how she acted as Nabis' right-hand in plundering towns; when describing Nabis' actions in Argos, he writes, "He had despoiled the men and now he sent his wife there to despoil the women."

One of Nabis' well-known torture devices, the Apega of Nabis, was modelled after her.

References

Sources
Livy's Ab Urbe Condita Libri
Polybius' Histories

3rd-century BC Spartans
2nd-century BC Spartans
Ancient Spartan women
Ancient Spartan queens consort
Ancient Argives